James Todd Smith (born January 14, 1968), known professionally as LL Cool J (short for Ladies Love Cool James), is an American rapper, songwriter, record producer, and actor. He is one of the earliest rappers to achieve commercial success, alongside fellow new school hip hop acts Beastie Boys and Run-DMC.

Signed to Def Jam Recordings in 1984, LL Cool J's breakthrough came with his single "I Need a Beat" and his landmark debut album, Radio (1985). He achieved further commercial and critical success with the albums Bigger and Deffer (1987), Walking with a Panther (1989), Mama Said Knock You Out (1990), Mr. Smith (1995), and Phenomenon (1997). His twelfth album, Exit 13 (2008), was his last in his long-tenured deal with Def Jam.

LL Cool J has appeared in numerous films, including Halloween H20, In Too Deep, Any Given Sunday, Deep Blue Sea, S.W.A.T., Mindhunters, Last Holiday, and Edison. He currently plays NCIS Special Agent Sam Hanna in the CBS crime drama television series NCIS: Los Angeles. LL Cool J was also the host of Lip Sync Battle on Paramount Network.

A two-time Grammy Award winner, LL Cool J is known for hip hop songs such as "Going Back to Cali", "I'm Bad", "The Boomin' System", "Rock the Bells", and "Mama Said Knock You Out", as well as R&B hits such as "Doin' It",  "I Need Love", "Around the Way Girl" and "Hey Lover". In 2010, VH1 placed him on their "100 Greatest Artists Of All Time" list. In 2017, LL Cool J became the first rapper to receive the Kennedy Center Honors. In 2021, he was inducted into the Rock and Roll Hall of Fame with an award for Musical Excellence.

Early life and family
James Todd Smith was born on January 14, 1968, in Bay Shore, New York to Ondrea Griffith (born on January 19, 1946) and James Louis Smith Jr, also known as James Nunya. According to the Chicago Tribune, "[As] a kid growing up middle class and Catholic in Queens, life for Smith was heart-breaking. His father shot his mother and grandfather, nearly killing them both. When 4-year-old Smith found them, blood was everywhere." In 1972, Smith and his mother moved into his grandparents' home in St. Albans, Queens, where he was raised. He suffered physical and mental abuse from his mother's ex-boyfriend Roscoe.

Smith began rapping at the age of 10, influenced by the hip-hop group The Treacherous Three. In 1984, sixteen-year-old Smith was creating demo tapes in his grandparents' home. His grandfather, a jazz saxophonist, bought him $2,000 worth of equipment, including two turntables, an audio mixer and an amplifier. During this time, Smith reconciled with his father who "made amends for a lot of things" by offering him guidance at the start of his music career. His mother was also supportive of his musical endeavors, using her tax refund to buy him a Korg drum machine. Smith has stated that by the time he received musical equipment from his relatives, he "was already a rapper. In this neighborhood, the kids grow up in rap. It's like speaking Spanish if you grow up in an all-Spanish house." This was at the same time that NYU student Rick Rubin and promoter-manager Russell Simmons founded the then-independent Def Jam label. By using the mixer he had received from his grandfather, Smith produced and mixed his own demos and sent them to various record companies throughout New York City, including Def Jam.

Musical career 
In the VH1 documentary Planet Rock: The Story of Hip Hop and the Crack Generation, Smith revealed that he initially called himself J-Ski, but did not want to associate his stage name with the cocaine culture (The rappers who use "Ski" or "Blow" as part of their stage name, e.g., Kurtis Blow and Joeski Love, were associated with the rise of the cocaine culture, as depicted in the 1983 remake of Scarface.) Under his new stage name LL Cool J (an abbreviation for Ladies Love Cool James), coined by his friend and fellow rapper Mikey D, Smith was signed by Def Jam, which led to the release of his first official record, the 12-inch single "I Need a Beat" (1984). The single was a hard-hitting, streetwise b-boy song with spare beats and ballistic rhymes. Smith later discussed his search for a label, stating "I sent my demo to many different companies, but it was Def Jam where I found my home." That same year, Smith made his professional debut concert performance at Manhattan Center High School. In a later interview, LL Cool J recalled the experience, stating "They pushed the lunch room tables together and me and my DJ, Cut Creator, started playing. ... As soon as it was over there were girls screaming and asking for autographs. Right then and there I said 'This is what I want to do'." LL's debut single sold over 100,000 copies and helped establish both Def Jam as a label and Smith as a rapper. The commercial success of "I Need a Beat", along with the Beastie Boys' single "Rock Hard" (1984), helped lead Def Jam to a distribution deal with Columbia Records the following year.

1985–1987: Radio
Radio was released to critical acclaim, both for production innovation and LL's powerful rap.
Released November 18, 1985, on Def Jam Recordings in the United States, Radio earned a significant amount of commercial success and sales for a hip hop record at the time. Shortly after its release, the album sold over 500,000 copies in its first five months, eventually selling over 1 million copies by 1988, according to the Recording Industry Association of America. Radio peaked at number 6 on the Top R&B/Hip-Hop Albums chart and at number 46 on the Billboard 200 albums chart. It entered the Top R&B/Hip-Hop Albums chart on December 28, 1985, and remained there for 47 weeks, while also entering the Pop Albums chart on January 11, 1986, remaining on that chart for thirty-eight weeks. By 1989, the album had earned platinum status from the Recording Industry Association of America (RIAA), with sales exceeding one million copies; it had previously earned a gold certification in the United States on April 14, 1986.
"I Can't Live Without My Radio" and "Rock the Bells" were singles that helped the album go platinum.  It eventually reached 1,500,000 copies sold in the US.

With the breakthrough success of his hit single "I Need a Beat" and the Radio LP, LL Cool J became one of the early hip-hop acts to achieve mainstream success along with Kurtis Blow and Run-D.M.C. Gigs at larger venues were offered to LL as he would join the 1986-'87 Raising Hell tour, opening for Run-D.M.C. and the Beastie Boys. Another milestone of LL's popularity was his appearance on American Bandstand as the first hip hop act on the show, as well as an appearance on Diana Ross' 1987 television special, Red Hot Rhythm & Blues.

The album's success also helped in contributing to Rick Rubin's credibility and repertoire as a record producer. Radio, along with Raising Hell (1986) and Licensed to Ill (1986), would form a trilogy of New York City-based, Rubin-helmed albums that helped to diversify hip-hop. Rubin's production credit on the back cover reads "REDUCED BY RICK RUBIN", referring to his minimalist production style, which gave the album its stripped-down and gritty sound. This style would serve as one of Rubin's production trademarks and would have a great impact on future hip-hop productions. Rubin's early hip hop production work, before his exit from Def Jam to Los Angeles, helped solidify his legacy as a hip hop pioneer and establish his reputation in the music industry.

1987–1993: Breakthrough and success
LL Cool J's second album was 1987's Bigger and Deffer, which was produced by DJ Pooh and the L.A. Posse. This stands as one of his biggest-selling career albums, having sold in excess of two million copies in the United States alone.  It spent 11 weeks at No. 1 on Billboards R&B albums chart.  It also reached No. 3 on the Billboards Pop albums chart. The album featured the singles "I'm Bad", the revolutionary "I Need Love" - LL's first #1 R&B and Top 40 hit, "Kanday", "Bristol Hotel", and "Go Cut Creator Go".
While Bigger and Deffer, which was a big success, was produced by the L.A. Posse (at the time consisting of Dwayne Simon, Darryl Pierce and, according to himself the most important for crafting the sound of the LP, Bobby "Bobcat" Ervin), Dwayne Simon was the only one left willing to work on producing LL Cool J's third album Walking with a Panther.  Released in 1989, the album was a commercial success, with several charting singles ("Going Back to Cali", which had originally been released on the 1987 movie soundtrack Less than Zero, "I'm That Type of Guy", "Big Ole Butt", and "One Shot at Love"). Despite commercial appeal, the album was often criticized by the hip-hop community as being too commercial and materialistic, and for focusing too much on love ballads.  As a result, his audience base began to decline due to the album's bold commercial and pop aspirations. According to Billboard, the album peaked at No. 6 on the Billboard 200 and was LL Cool J's second #1 R&B Album where it spent five weeks.

In 1990, LL released Mama Said Knock You Out, his fourth studio album. The Marley Marl produced album received critical acclaim and eventually went double Platinum, selling over two million copies according to the RIAA. Mama Said Knock You Out marked a turning point in LL Cool J's career, as he proved to critics his ability to stay relevant and hard-edged despite the misgivings of his previous album.  LL won a Grammy Award for Best Rap Solo Performance in 1992 for the title track.  The album's immense success propelled Mama Said Knock You Out to be LL's top selling album of his career (as of 2002) and solidified his status as a hip-hop icon. LL also recorded a rap solo for Michael Jackson's demo of "Serious Effect" that remains unreleased but leaked online

1993–2005: Continued success and career prominence

After acting in The Hard Way and Toys, LL Cool J released 14 Shots to the Dome. The album had four singles ("How I'm Comin'", "Back Seat (of My Jeep)", "Pink Cookies in a Plastic Bag Getting Crushed by Buildings", "Stand By Your Man") and guest-featured labelmates Lords of the Underground on "NFA-No Frontin' Allowed".  The album went gold.

LL Cool J starred in In the House, an NBC sitcom, before releasing Mr. Smith (1995), which went on to sell over two million copies. Its singles included "Hey Lover", "Doin' It" and "Loungin". "Hey Lover", featured Boyz II Men, and sampled Michael Jackson's "The Lady in My Life". The song also earned him a Grammy Award. Another song from the album, "I Shot Ya Remix", included debut vocal work by Foxy Brown.
In 1996, Def Jam released this "greatest hits" package, offering a good summary of Cool J's career, from the relentless minimalism of early hits such as "Rock the Bells" to the smooth-talking braggadocio that followed. Classic albums including Bigger and Deffer and Mama Said Knock You Out are well represented here. In December 1996, his loose cover of the Rufus and Chaka Khan song "Ain't Nobody" was included on the Beavis and Butt-Head Do America soundtrack & released as a single. LL Cool J's interpretation of "Ain't Nobody" was particularly successful in the United Kingdom, where it topped the UK Singles Chart in early-1997.
Later that same year, he released the album Phenomenon. The singles included "Phenomenon" and "Father". The official second single from Phenomenon was "4, 3, 2, 1", which featured Method Man, Redman & Master P and introduced DMX and Canibus.

In 2000, LL Cool J released the album G.O.A.T., which stood for the "Greatest of All Time." It debuted at number one on the Billboard album charts, and went platinum. LL Cool J thanked Canibus in the liner notes of the album, "for the inspiration". LL Cool J's next album 10 from 2002, was his ninth studio (10th overall including his greatest hits compilation All World), and included the singles "Paradise" (featuring Amerie), and the number 1 R&B hit "Luv U Better", produced by the Neptunes. Later pressings of the album added the 2003 Jennifer Lopez duet, "All I Have". The album reached platinum status. LL Cool J's tenth album The DEFinition was released on August 31, 2004. The album debuted at No. 4 on the Billboard charts. Production came from Timbaland, 7 Aurelius, R. Kelly, and others. The lead single was the Timbaland-produced "Headsprung", which peaked at No. 7 on the Hip-Hop and R&B singles chart, and No. 16 on the Billboard Hot 100. The second single was the 7 Aurelius–produced, "Hush", which peaked at No. 14 on the Billboard Hip-Hop and R&B chart and No. 26 on the Hot 100.

2006–2012: Exit 13 and touring
LL Cool J's 11th album, Todd Smith, was released on April 11, 2006. It includes collaborations with 112, Ginuwine, Juelz Santana, Teairra Mari and Freeway. The first single was the Jermaine Dupri-produced "Control Myself" featuring Jennifer Lopez. They shot the video for "Control Myself" on January 2, 2006, at Sony Studios, New York. The second video, directed by Hype Williams, was "Freeze" featuring Lyfe Jennings.

In July 2006, LL Cool J announced details about his final album with Def Jam Recordings, the only label he has ever been signed to. The album is titled Exit 13. The album was originally scheduled to be executively produced by fellow Queens rapper 50 Cent. Exit 13 was originally slated for a fall 2006 release, however, after a 2-year delay, it was released on September 9, 2008 without 50 Cent as the executive producer. Tracks that the two worked on were leaked to the internet and some of the tracks produced with 50 made it to Exit 13.
LL Cool J partnered with DJ Kay Slay to release a mixtape called "The Return of the G.O.A.T.". It was the first mixtape of his 24-year career and includes freestyling by LL Cool J in addition to other rappers giving their renditions of his songs. A track titled "Hi Haterz" was leaked onto the internet on June 1, 2008. The song contains LL Cool J rapping over the instrumental to Maino's "Hi Hater". He toured with Janet Jackson on her Rock Witchu tour, only playing in Los Angeles, Chicago, Toronto, and Kansas City.

In September 2009, LL Cool J released a song about the NCIS TV series. It is a single and is available on iTunes. The new track is based on his experiences playing special agent Sam Hanna. "This song is the musical interpretation of what I felt after meeting with NCIS agents, experienced Marines and Navy SEALs," LL Cool J said. "It represents the collective energy in the room. I was so inspired I wrote the song on set."

At South by Southwest in March 2011, LL Cool J was revealed to be Z-Trip's special guest at the Red Bull Thre3Style showcase. This marked the beginning of a creative collaboration between the rap and DJ superstars. The two took part in an interview with Carson Daly where they discussed their partnership. Both artists have promised future collaborations down the road, with LL Cool J calling the duo "organic" One early track to feature LL's talents was Z-Trip's remix of British rock act Kasabian's single "Days Are Forgotten", which was named by influential DJ Zane Lowe as his "Hottest Record In The World" and received a favorable reception in both Belgium and the United Kingdom. In January 2012, the pair released the track "Super Baller" as a free download to celebrate the New York Giants Super Bowl victory. The two have been touring together since 2011, with future dates planned through 2012 and beyond.

2012–present: Authentic, G.O.A.T. 2 and future projects
On October 6, 2012, LL Cool J released "Ratchet", a new single from his upcoming album titled Authentic Hip-Hop. Following that, on November 3, 2012, LL collaborated with Joe and the production duo Trackmasters on his second single, "Take It". 

On February 8, 2013, it was announced that the title of LL's upcoming album would be changed from Authentic Hip-Hop to Authentic, with a new release date of April 30, 2013. A new cover was also unveiled. At around the same time, it was announced that LL Cool J had collaborated with Van Halen guitarist Eddie Van Halen on two tracks on the album.

On October 16, 2013, the Rock and Roll Hall of Fame announced LL Cool J as a nominee for inclusion in 2014. In October 2014, LL announced that his 14th studio album would be called G.O.A.T. 2 and would be released in 2015. LL stated that "the concept behind the album was to give upcoming artists an opportunity to shine, and put myself in the position where I have to spit bars with some of the hardest rhymers in the game"; however, the album was put on hold. LL Cool J explained the reason for it, saying, "It was good but I didn't feel like it was ready yet."

On January 21, 2016, LL received a star on the Hollywood Walk of Fame.

In March 2016, LL announced his retirement on social media, but quickly walked back his announcement and indicated that a new album was on the way. LL hosted the Grammy Awards Show for five consecutive years, from the 54th Grammy Awards on February 12, 2012, through the 58th Grammy Awards on February 15, 2016.

In October 2018, LL Cool J was nominated for the Rock and Roll Hall of Fame. In September 2019, it was announced that LL had re-signed to Def Jam for future album releases. His upcoming album will be produced by Q-Tip.

On December 29, 2021, LL Cool J canceled his performance at Dick Clark's New Year's Rockin' Eve With Ryan Seacrest 2022 after testing positive for COVID-19.

LL hosted the 2022 iHeartRadio Music Awards on March 22, 2022.

Acting career
While LL Cool J first appeared as a rapper in the movie Krush Groove (performing "I Can't Live Without My Radio"), his first acting part was a small role in a high school football movie called Wildcats. He landed the role of Captain Patrick Zevo in Barry Levinson's 1992 film Toys. From 1995 to 1999, he starred in his own television sitcom In the House. He portrayed an ex-Oakland Raiders running back who finds himself in financial difficulties and is forced to rent part of his home out to a single mother and her two children, one of whom moves out with her before the third season.

In 1998, LL Cool J played security guard Ronny in Halloween H20, the seventh movie in the Halloween franchise. In 1999, co-starred as Preacher, the chef in the Renny Harlin horror/comedy Deep Blue Sea. He received positive reviews for his role as Dwayne Gittens, an underworld boss nicknamed "God", in In Too Deep. Later that year, he starred as Julian Washington—a talented but selfish running back on fictional professional football team the Miami Sharks—in Oliver Stone's drama Any Given Sunday. He and co-star Jamie Foxx allegedly got into a real fistfight while filming a fight scene. During the next two years, LL Cool J appeared in Rollerball, Deliver Us from Eva, S.W.A.T., and Mindhunters.

In 2005, he returned to television in a guest-starring role on the Fox medical drama House; he portrayed a death row inmate felled by an unknown disease in an episode entitled "Acceptance". He appeared as Queen Latifah's love interest in the 2006 movie Last Holiday. He also guest-starred on 30 Rock in the 2007 episode "The Source Awards", portraying a hip-hop producer called Ridikulous who Tracy Jordan fears may kill him. LL Cool J appeared in Sesame Streets 39th season, introducing the word of the day--"Unanimous"—in episode 4169 (September 22, 2008) and performing "The Addition Expedition" in episode 4172 (September 30, 2008).

Since 2009, LL Cool J has starred on the CBS police procedural NCIS: Los Angeles. The show is a spin-off of NCIS, which itself is a spin-off of the naval legal drama JAG. LL Cool J portrays NCIS Special Agent Sam Hanna, an ex–Navy SEAL who is fluent in Arabic and is an expert on West Asian culture. The series debuted in autumn of 2009, but the characters were introduced in an April 2009 crossover episode on the parent show. In 2013, LL received a Teen Choice Award for Choice TV Actor: Action for his work on the show.

In 2013, LL co-starred as a gym owner in the sports dramedy Grudge Match. Since April 2015, LL has hosted the show Lip Sync Battle. He played Beth's father in Neighbors 2: Sorority Rising and was shown in a trailer for the film but his scenes were cut from the final product.

Other ventures
LL Cool J worked behind the scenes with the mid-1980s hip-hop sportswear line TROOP.
LL Cool J launched a clothing line (called "Todd Smith"). The brand produces popular urban apparel. Designs include influences from LL's lyrics and tattoos, as well as from other icons in the hip-hop community.
LL Cool J has written four books, including I Make My Own Rules, (1997), an autobiography cowritten with Karen Hunter. His second book was the children-oriented book called And The Winner Is... published in 2002. In 2006, LL Cool J and his personal trainer, Dave "Scooter" Honig, wrote a fitness book titled The Platinum Workout. His fourth book, LL Cool J (Hip-Hop Stars) was cowritten in 2007 with hip-hop historian Dustin Shekell and Public Enemy's Chuck D.

LL Cool J started his own businesses in the music industry such as the music label in 1993 called P.O.G. (Power Of God) and formed the company Rock The Bells to produce music. With the Rock The Bells label, he had artists such as AMyth,  Smokeman, Natice, Chantel Jones and Simone Starks. Rock the Bells Records was also responsible for the Deep Blue Sea soundtrack for the 1999 movie of the same name. Rufus "Scola" Waller was also signed to the label, but was released when the label folded.
LL Cool J founded and launched Boomdizzle.com, a record label / social networking site launched in September 2008. The website accepts music uploads from aspiring artists, primarily from the hip-hop genre, and the site's users rate songs through contests, voting, and other community events.

In March 2015, LL Cool J also appeared in an introduction to WrestleMania 31.

Legacy
With the breakthrough success of his hit single "I Need a Beat" and the Radio LP, LL Cool J became an early hip-hop act to achieve mainstream success along with Kurtis Blow and Run-DMC. Gigs at larger venues were offered to LL as he would join the 1986-'87 Raising Hell tour, opening for Run-D.M.C. and the Beastie Boys. Another milestone of LL's popularity was his appearance on American Bandstand as the first hip-hop act on the show.

The album's success also helped in contributing to Rick Rubin's credibility and repertoire as a record producer. Radio, along with Raising Hell (1986) and Licensed to Ill (1986), would form a trilogy of New York City-based, Rubin-helmed albums that helped to diversify hip-hop. Rubin's production credit on the back cover reads "REDUCED BY RICK RUBIN", referring to his minimalist production style, which gave the album its stripped-down and gritty sound. This style would serve as one of Rubin's production trademarks and would have a great impact on future hip-hop productions. Rubin's early hip hop production work, before his exit from Def Jam to Los Angeles, helped solidify his legacy as a hip hop pioneer and establish his reputation in the music industry.

Radios release coincided with the growing new school scene and subculture, which also marked the beginning of hip-hop's "golden age" and the replacement of old school hip hop. This period of hip hop was marked by the end of the disco rap stylings of old school, which had flourished prior to the mid-1980s, and the rise of a new style featuring "ghetto blasters". Radio served as one of the earliest records, along with Run-D.M.C.'s debut album, to combine the vocal approach of hip hop and rapping with the musical arrangements and riffing sound of rock music, pioneering the rap rock hybrid sound.

The emerging new-school scene was initially characterized by drum machine-led minimalism, often tinged with elements of rock, as well as boasts about rapping delivered in an aggressive, self-assertive style. In image as in song, the artists projected a tough, cool, street b-boy attitude. These elements contrasted sharply with the 1970s P-Funk and disco-influenced outfits, live bands, synthesizers and party rhymes of acts prevalent in 1984, rendering them old school. In contrast to the lengthy, jam-like form predominant throughout early hip hop ("King Tim III", "Rapper's Delight", "The Breaks"), new-school artists tended to compose shorter songs that would be more accessible and had potential for radio play, and conceived more cohesive LPs than their old-school counterparts; the style typified by LL Cool J's Radio. A leading example of the new school sound is the song "I Can't Live Without My Radio", a loud, defiant declaration of public loyalty to his boom box, which The New York Times described as "quintessential rap in its directness, immediacy and assertion of self". It was featured in the film Krush Groove (1985), which was based on the rise of Def Jam and new school acts such as Run-D.M.C. and the Fat Boys.

The energy and hardcore delivery and musical style of rapping featured on Radio, as well as other new-school recordings by artists such as Run-D.M.C., Schooly D, T La Rock and Steady B, proved to be influential to hip-hop acts of the "golden age" such as Boogie Down Productions and Public Enemy. The decline of the old-school form of hip hop also led to the closing of Sugar Hill Records, one of the labels that helped contribute to early hip hop and that, coincidentally, rejected LL's demo tape. As the album served as an example of an expansion of hip-hop music's artistic possibilities, its commercial success and distinct sound soon led to an increase in multi-racial audiences and listeners, adding to the legacy of the album and hip hop as well.EntertainmentSimone Smith, LL Cool J's Wife: 5 Fast Facts You Need to Know , heavy.com April 22, 2015

In 2017, LL Cool J became the first rapper to receive Kennedy Center Honors.

In 2021, he was inducted into the Rock and Roll Hall of Fame with an award for Musical Excellence.

 Personal life 
Smith dated Kidada Jones, daughter of producer Quincy Jones, from 1992 to 1994. He married Simone Johnson in 1995. The couple met in 1987 and have four children.

In an episode of Finding Your Roots, Smith learned that his mother was adopted by Eugene Griffith and Ellen Hightower. The series' genetic genealogist CeCe Moore identified Smith's biological grandparents as Ethel Mae Jolly and Nathaniel Christy Lewis through analysis of his DNA. Smith's biological great-uncle was Hall of Fame boxer John Henry Lewis.

Political involvement
In 2002, LL Cool J supported George Pataki's bid for a third term as Governor of New York.  In 2003, LL Cool J spoke at a U.S. Senate Committee hearing on the RIAA lawsuits against Americans distributing or downloading copyrighted music over peer-to-peer networks. He appeared to endorse the RIAA's position, claiming illegal file sharing was hurting his sales and that his session musicians "can't live" due to the lost income. Chuck D provided an opposing viewpoint, saying free file-sharing could be leveraged as a promotional tool and the industry was being overprotective of its copyright. LL also voiced his support for New York State Senator Malcolm Smith, a Democrat, during an appearance on the senator's local television show; LL worked with Smith in putting on the annual Jump and Ball Tournament in the rapper's childhood neighborhood of St. Albans, Queens. In a February 10, 2012 televised interview with CNN host Piers Morgan, LL Cool J expressed sympathy for President Barack Obama and ascribed negative impressions of his leadership to Republican obstruction designed to "make it look like you have a coordination problem." He was quick to add that no one "should assume that I'm a Democrat either. I'm an Independent, you know?" In his 2020 book LL Cool J's Platinum 360 Diet and Lifestyle, he included Obama in a list of people he admired, stating that the then-president had "accomplished what people thought was impossible."

Philanthropy
LL Cool J has his own charitable foundation called Jump & Ball, which is based in his hometown of Queens, New York, and offers an athletic and team-building program for young people. He is also involved in many charitable causes for literacy, music, and arts programs for kids and schools.

Discography

Studio albums
 Radio (1985)
 Bigger and Deffer (1987)
 Walking with a Panther (1989)
 Mama Said Knock You Out (1990)
 14 Shots to the Dome (1993)
 Mr. Smith (1995)
 Phenomenon (1997)
 G.O.A.T. (2000)
 10 (2002)
 The DEFinition (2004)
 Todd Smith (2006)
 Exit 13 (2008)
 Authentic (2013)

Filmography

Film

Television

Documentary

Awards and nominations

Music

Grammy Awards

MTV Video Music Awards

NAACP Image Awards

Soul Train Music Awards

Other honors and awards

 1988  Enstooled as Kwasi Achi-Bru, a chieftain of the Akan people, in Abidjan, Ivory Coast
 1991  Billboard Top Rap Singles Artist
 1997  Patrick Lippert Award, Rock The Vote
 2003  Source Foundation Image Award, for "his community work"
 2007  Long Island Music Hall of Fame, Inducted as part of the Inaugural Class of Inductees for his contribution to Long Island's rich musical heritage
 2011  BET Hip Hop Awards, Honored with the I Am Hip Hop Award' for his contributions to hip-hop culture
 2013  A New York City double decker tour bus was dedicated to LL Cool J and his life's work
 2014 – Honorary Doctor of Arts, Northeastern University, for his contributions to hip-hop culture
 2016  LL Cool J was awarded a star on the Hollywood Walk Of Fame.
 2017  first hip hop artist to receive a Kennedy Center Honor
  LL Cool J has been nominated six times for induction into The Rock and Roll Hall Of Fame.  He has been nominated in 2010, 2011, 2014, 2018, 2019, and 2021 as a performer. In 2021, He was inducted into The Rock and Roll Hall of Fame with an award for Musical Excellence.
  2022  Honored with the Key of the City of New York in the Queens borough

Acting

References

Further reading

External links

 
 
 

 
1968 births
Living people
20th-century American male actors
20th-century American rappers
21st-century American male actors
21st-century American rappers
429 Records artists
African-American Catholics
African-American male actors
African-American male rappers
African-American record producers
African-American songwriters
American hip hop record producers
American male film actors
American male rappers
American male songwriters
American male television actors
American philanthropists
Def Jam Recordings artists
Grammy Award winners for rap music
Kennedy Center honorees
Male actors from New York City
Musicians from Queens, New York
People from Bay Shore, New York
People from Hollis, Queens
People from St. Albans, Queens
Pop rappers
Rappers from New York City
Record producers from New York (state)
Songwriters from New York (state)